Mallory Bechtel (born November 26, 1999) is an American musical theatre actress based in New York City. She has performed as lead and understudy in several musicals including the Tony Award-winning musical, Dear Evan Hansen on Broadway. She has also appeared in multiple television shows and films. In 2022, she starred as twins Karen and Kelly Beasley on Pretty Little Liars: Original Sin. 

Bechtel was nominated at Broadway.com Audience Awards in 2019 for her role as Zoe Murphy in Dear Evan Hansen.

Biography
Bechtel was born in 1999, in The Woodlands, Texas, a suburb of Houston.  She spent her early years in The Woodlands where she attended and graduated from The John Cooper School. Bechtel had plans to study at New York University Tisch School of the Arts after high school graduation but her plans were deferred when she was cast as Zoe Murphy in the musical Dear Evan Hansen in 2018.

Bechtel started acting at the age of eight. She appeared for the first time on the professional stage in 2008 when she was cast as Susan Waverly for Theatre Under the Stars production of White Christmas. In 2015, at the age of 15, Bechtel auditioned for the role of Zoe Murphy in Dear Evan Hansen, but was originally denied the part. Two years later, in August 2017, Bechtel was offered a vacation standby role for original Dear Evan Hansen cast member, Laura Dreyfuss. Bechtel never performed as Zoe during this time. However, in July 2018, she took over the role of Zoe Murphy full-time and was on stage at The Music Box Theatre for a year until July 2019. Gabrielle Carrubba took over the role of Zoe after Bechtel's departure from the show.

Apart from performing on stage, Bechtel has appeared in various shows and films. In 2018, Bechtel appeared on NBC's Law & Order: Special Victims Unit. The same year she was cast in Ari Aster's supernatural horror film, Hereditary.  In 2020, Bechtel appeared in FBI: Most Wanted on CBS. Her cover of "Requiem" from Dear Evan Hansen garnered over 4 million views on YouTube and gained her a social audience of over sixty thousand followers on YouTube and Instagram collectively. Bechtel was scheduled to play Kim MacAfee in Bye Bye Birdie at the Kennedy Center in 2020, but the production was canceled because of the COVID-19 pandemic.

Filmography

Theatre

Film

Television

Awards and nominations

References

External links
Official website

Actresses from Houston
1999 births
Living people
People from The Woodlands, Texas
American musical theatre actresses
American television actresses
American film actresses
21st-century American actresses